Brown is the second album by Christian nu metal band P.O.D.. The album was released on Rescue Records and was initially released on October 8, 1996.

Track listing

Notes

 Tracks 1, 4, 5, 7, 9, 11 and 15 have no lyrics listed in the CD booklet, even though most of the tracks actually have lyrics.
 Track 1 contains a sample of the LL Cool J song "I Shot Ya" off the album Mr. Smith.
 Track 5 contains a sample of the Boogie Down Productions song "My Philosophy" off the album By All Means Necessary.
 Track 14 contains a sample of the N.W.A song 'Gangsta Gangsta': "And here's the plot, takin' niggas out with a flurry of buckshots" off the album Straight Outta Compton.
 A special edition version of the album was released in 2000 on an enhanced CD featuring a footage of P.O.D. performing "Breathe Babylon" and the music video for "Selah".

Credits

P.O.D.
Sonny Sandoval – vocals
Marcos Curiel – lead guitar
Traa Daniels – bass guitar
Wuv Bernardo – drums, rhythm guitar

Guest musicians
 Mike$ki – scratching
 Dirt (from the Shadow of the Locust crew) – "Breathe Babylon" and "Seeking the Wise"

References

P.O.D. albums
1996 albums